Simcha is a Hebrew word that means gladness, or joy, and is often used as a given name.

Uses

The concept of simcha is an important one in Jewish philosophy. A popular teaching by Rabbi Nachman of Breslov, a 19th-century Chassidic Rabbi, is "Mitzvah Gedolah Le'hiyot Besimcha Tamid," it is a great mitzvah (commandment) to always be in a state of happiness. When a person is happy one is much more capable of serving God and going about one's daily activities than when depressed or upset.

Jews often use simcha in its capacity as a Hebrew and Yiddish noun meaning festive occasion. The term is used for any happy occasion, such as a wedding, Bar Mitzvah or engagement.

Holidays
The day of Simchat Torah, "Rejoice in the Law", marks the completion and beginning of the annual cycle of reading the Torah.

Other uses
Simcha is also the name of a kosher beer from Saxony, Germany. It was also a slang term used in Jewish-American organized crime circles to refer to a pimp.

Name
Simcha is also used as a given name, for men or women. In the Ashkenazi Jewish tradition, the name Simcha is most likely to be used for a boy, while in the Sephardic/Israeli tradition it would be a girl's name.

See also
Religion and happiness
Happiness in Judaism

References

External links
"Simcha Blisters" article about Jewish attitude of accountability to experience Simcha
"Simcha" - Jewish music from New Zealand
SimchaMaker - Simcha Productions in Israel
"SimchaHappens" - a blog by an individual embracing simcha
"The South Coast Simcha Band" - A klezmer and Yiddish band in southern California

Hebrew words and phrases
Jewish culture